Colleen Mary “Coco” Miller (born September 6, 1978) is an American former professional basketball player. She is the identical twin sister of fellow WNBA player Kelly Miller.

Early years
Born in Rochester, Minnesota, Coco played basketball with her sister at Mayo High School, and made it to a championship in, where she lost in the finals. The twins also helped their school go 27-0 and win the Minnesota state's class 4A championship. Miller was named a WBCA All-American. She participated in the WBCA High School All-America Game where she scored eight points.

College years
The twins went to University of Georgia, where they both majored in biology and won a series of awards, including the James E. Sullivan Award, given to the nation's top amateur athlete. They earned that award in 1999, becoming the first pair of twins to earn the award, and joining Carl Lewis, Greg Louganis, Bill Walton, Bill Bradley, Kurt Thomas, Jackie Joyner-Kersee and Janet Evans as recipients of the award.

Coco was among the top ten in that school's list among women basketball players in assists and steals. She participated in the World University Games, helping her team to a silver medal. She finished her college career fifth among SEC women in scoring at 16.6, second in free throw percentage at .743% from the free throw line, and eighth in steals with 160. She was a finalist for the Naismith award as the player of the year during her final college season.

Georgia statistics
Source

USA Basketball

Miller played on the team representing the US at the 1999 World University Games held in Palma de Mallorca, Spain. The team had a 4–2 record and earned the silver medal. Miller averaged 8.3 points per game.

WNBA career
In 2001, Coco and Kelly entered the WNBA Draft. Coco was selected by the Washington Mystics 9th overall in the 1st round, where she averaged 6.4 points, 2.4 rebounds and 1.7 assists per game in her rookie season. She played 250 total regular season matches for the Mystics through the end of the 2008 season, just nine short of Murriel Page's club record of 259.

On May 11, 2009, Coco Miller was waived by the Mystics; four days later she was signed by the WNBA's Atlanta Dream.

Her role in 2009 was as support and mentor for rookie point guard Shalee Lehning.

In the 2010 regular season she was sent further down the depth chart, behind Lehning and her sister, newly acquired by the Dream. However, after Kelly Miller's ankle injury, Coco received more playing time. She started the first game of the Eastern Conference Semifinals against her former team, the Washington Mystics, and in this game she scored 21 points.

NWBL career
After the 2002 WNBA season, both sisters played for the Birmingham Power of the National Women's Basketball League (NWBL).

International career
 2002–2003:  Fenerbahçe Istanbul (Turkey)
 2003–2004:  Fenerbahçe Istanbul (Turkey)
 2006–2007:  Lattes-Maurin Montpellier (LFB, France)

WNBA career statistics

Regular season

|-
| style="text-align:left;"|2001
| style="text-align:left;"|Washington
| 20 || 0 || 6.9 || .325 || .333 || .545 || 0.5 || 0.4 || 0.3 || 0.0 || 0.7 || 1.7
|-
| style="text-align:left;"|2002
| style="text-align:left;"|Washington
| 32 || 32 || 28.3 || .433 || .375 || .821 || 3.6 || 2.6 || 1.0 || 0.1 || 1.8 || 9.3
|-
| style="text-align:left;"|2003
| style="text-align:left;"|Washington
| 33 || 33 || 32.6 || .450 || .360 || .698 || 3.8 || 2.6 || 1.2 || 0.2 || 1.6 || 12.5
|-
| style="text-align:left;"|2004
| style="text-align:left;"|Washington
| 33 || 8 || 19.3 || .431 || .263 || .786 || 1.9 || 1.3 || 0.6 || 0.1 || 0.8 || 4.8
|-
| style="text-align:left;"|2005
| style="text-align:left;"|Washington
| 34 || 4 || 14.7 || .425 || .375 || .800 || 1.7 || 1.3 || 0.8 || 0.1 || 0.8 || 4.5
|-
| style="text-align:left;"|2006
| style="text-align:left;"|Washington
| 34 || 4 || 19.4 || .491 || .400 || .897 || 2.7 || 1.7 || 1.0 || 0.1 || 1.4 || 6.1
|-
| style="text-align:left;"|2007
| style="text-align:left;"|Washington
| 30 || 2 || 15.2 || .405 || .400 || 1.000 || 1.6 || 0.8 || 0.6 || 0.1 || 1.0 || 4.0
|-
| style="text-align:left;"|2008
| style="text-align:left;"|Washington
| 34 || 6 || 20.9 || .355 || .283 || .625 || 2.5 || 1.4 || 0.8 || 0.2 || 1.7 || 5.3
|-
| style="text-align:left;"|2009
| style="text-align:left;"|Atlanta
| 34 || 5 || 12.0 || .410 || .296 || .885 || 1.5 || 1.0 || 0.4 || 0.1 || 0.9 || 3.9
|-
| style="text-align:left;"|2010
| style="text-align:left;"|Atlanta
| 27 || 0 || 7.3 || .400 || .192 || .857 || 0.6 || 0.8 || 0.2 || 0.0 || 0.7 || 3.1
|-
| style="text-align:left;"|2011
| style="text-align:left;"|Atlanta
| 31 || 5 || 17.4 || .432 || .333 || .541 || 1.9 || 1.4 || 0.6 || 0.0 || 1.0 || 7.3
|-
| style="text-align:left;"|2012
| style="text-align:left;"|Los Angeles
| 10 || 1 || 14.1 || .297 || .333 || 1.000 || 2.7 || 1.1 || 0.2 || 0.0 || 1.3 || 2.6
|-
| style="text-align:left;"|Career
| style="text-align:left;"|12 years, 3 teams
| 352 || 100 || 18.1 || .423 || .336 || .764 || 2.1 || 1.4 || 0.7 || 0.1 || 1.2 || 5.8

Playoffs

|-
| style="text-align:left;"|2002
| style="text-align:left;"|Washington
| 5 || 5 || 32.6 || .420 || .545 || .600 || 3.0 || 2.4 || 0.4 || 0.0 || 1.4 || 10.8
|-
| style="text-align:left;"|2004
| style="text-align:left;"|Washington
| 3 || 0 || 17.0 || .368 || .000 || 1.000 || 2.3 || 0.7 || 1.7 || 0.0 || 0.7 || 5.3
|-
| style="text-align:left;"|2006
| style="text-align:left;"|Washington
| 2 || 0 || 18.5 || .467 || .500 || .250 || 3.0 || 1.0 || 0.5 || 0.0 || 2.0 || 8.0
|-
| style="text-align:left;"|2009
| style="text-align:left;"|Atlanta
| 2 || 0 || 6.5 || .600 || 1.000 || .000 || 0.0 || 1.0 || 0.0 || 0.0 || 0.5 || 3.5
|-
| style="text-align:left;"|2010
| style="text-align:left;"|Atlanta
| 7 || 7 || 25.7 || .391 || .263 || .789 || 2.7 || 3.3 || 1.3 || 0.0 || 2.0 || 10.6
|-
| style="text-align:left;"|2011
| style="text-align:left;"|Atlanta
| 8 || 0 || 8.0 || .200 || .200 || .500 || 1.3 || 0.9 || 0.5 || 0.0 || 0.5 || 1.3
|-
| style="text-align:left;"|Career
| style="text-align:left;"|6 years, 2 teams
| 27 || 12 || 18.8 || .388 || .368 || .676 || 2.1 || 1.8 || 0.8 || 0.0 || 1.2 || 6.6

Notes

External links

WNBA Article and interview with both sisters
Article on Coco's 2002 "Most Improved Player" Award

1978 births
Living people
American expatriate basketball people in China
American expatriate basketball people in France
American expatriate basketball people in Turkey
American women's basketball players
Atlanta Dream players
Basketball players from Minnesota
Fenerbahçe women's basketball players
Georgia Lady Bulldogs basketball players
Identical twins
James E. Sullivan Award recipients
Los Angeles Sparks players
Parade High School All-Americans (girls' basketball)
Shandong Six Stars players
Shooting guards
Sportspeople from Rochester, Minnesota
American twins
Twin sportspeople
Universiade medalists in basketball
Universiade silver medalists for the United States
Washington Mystics draft picks
Washington Mystics players